Footsteps is a not-for-profit organization based in New York City that provides educational, vocational, and social support to people who have left or want to leave an Haredi or Hasidic Jewish community in the United States.

Mission 
According to its website, Footsteps provides educational, vocational, professional, social, and legal support to those seeking to enter or explore the world beyond the insular ultra-Orthodox communities in which they were raised. Some people from the Haredi and Hasidic communities who choose to enter mainstream America may feel like "cultural immigrants". They may face cultural disorientation and isolation, coupled with a lack of practical and marketable skills. Founded in December 2003, Footsteps aims to assist individuals who choose to make this transition. Individuals frequently refer to themselves as "off the derech", or OTD, reclaiming the dismissive term given to leavers by members of the ultra-Orthodox communities they have left.

History 
Footsteps was founded in December 2003, by Malkie Schwartz, a former Chabad Hasid from Crown Heights, while enrolled as a student at Hunter College in New York City. According to Schwartz, 20 people showed up to the first meeting, announced on flyers around the Hunter campus and through word of mouth. Footsteps began as an informal social group, and soon developed an educational study group and a sex education and relationships group, members finding they had been denied access to basic sex education instruction within the Haredi community.

As the organization grew, it became a 501(c) non-profit, with a broad remit of support and education for ex-Haredi Jews. Footsteps can also provide counseling, and has partnered with New York Legal Assistance Group to provide legal assistance and advice in divorce and custody cases.

As of summer 2015, Footsteps has a permanent staff of 10, a membership of over 1000, and an annual budget in excess of $1 million. Its current director is Lani Santo. The organization's program director is Chani Getter.

Activities 

Footsteps provides an array of services for its members. The Footsteps offices are known as "The Space", and are situated at an unpublicized location, due to privacy concerns. They contain a computer lab, library, meeting space, kitchenette, and lounge, where members can work and hang out. Members gather for various groups, events, and workshops on topics including dating and sexuality, navigating the college admissions process, career advancement, and painting.

Footsteps also holds several annual events, which are open to members and guests. Events include: Thanksgiving dinner, Passover Potluck, and an annual camping trip. Since 2009, "Footsteps Celebrates" has been held each year in June, to celebrate graduations, accomplishments, and leadership roles. During the summer months of 2012, Footsteps organized a weekly soccer game in Prospect Park. During winter, an indoor game of basketball took place bi-weekly.

Footsteps has also held annual art shows in which it exhibits works by Footsteps members.

Impact 
Abby Stein, a formerly Ultra-Orthodox rabbi and author in her book Becoming Eve, as well as in numerous interviews, credits Footsteps with helping her succeed after she left the Hasidic community, even calling their work "life saving." In a March 2021 interview with the New York magazine, she credits Footsteps therapists with helping her both, when she left the Hasidic community, and later when she came out as transgender women, saying that speaking with a Footsteps social worker "was the first time I ever spoke to a professional where I felt listened to, as opposed to feeling like a problem that needed solving."

Leadership 
Board members include author Shulem Deen and businessman Steve Eisman.

Notable members 
 Jericho Vincent, author
 Shulem Deen, author
 Luzer Twersky, actor
 Abby Stein, author and trans activist
 Naftuli Moster, founder of YAFFED and CEO until late 2022. 
 Chani Getter, councillor

Media exposure
Footsteps has been featured in numerous media outlets, including The New York Times, The Wall Street Journal, The Guardian, PBS, NBC, and many others. The book Unchosen: The Hidden Lives of Hasidic Rebels by Hella Winston relates the story of the founder of Footsteps and some of those who have gone through the organization as part of their journey to leave the Haredi and Hasidic communities. The National Geographic program, "Inside Hasidism", included a segment about Footsteps and some of its members. The 2017 documentary, One of Us, referenced Footsteps repeatedly.

See also 
Faith to Faithless
Mavar, a UK-based organization which supports the transition of leaving the Haredi lifestyle in Britain
Off the derech
One of Us
Religious disaffiliation

References

External links 
 Footsteps Official Website

Disengagement from religion
Non-profit organizations based in the United States
Secular Jewish culture in the United States
Anti-Orthodox Judaism sentiment